Sir Pattiyapathirennehelage Albert Fredrick Peries, KBE (12 May 1905 – 21 September 1967) was the 4th Speaker of the Parliament of Sri Lanka. Serving as Deputy Speaker Peries first became Speaker with the sudden death of Francis Molamure, who collapsed and died while presiding over the session.

Peries attended St. Joseph's College, Colombo where he was a keen sportsman. He entered the Ceylon Law College and qualified as a proctor and a notary public.  

He was elected to the seat of Nattandiya in the 1947 parliamentary election and was re-elected in the 1952, 1960 (March and July), 1965 and died in office in 1967. He only lost the 1956 parliamentary election to Hugh Fernando.

Peries was appointed a Knight Commander of the Most Excellent Order of the British Empire in the 1954 Birthday Honours during his first tenure as Speaker. The Sir Albert F. Peiris Sports Complex in Wennappuwa is named after him.

References

External links
Peries, Pattiyapathirennehelage Albert Fredrick (Sir)
Speaker of the Parliament

|-

Speakers of the Parliament of Sri Lanka
Deputy speakers and chairmen of committees of the Parliament of Sri Lanka
Members of the 1st Parliament of Ceylon
Members of the 2nd Parliament of Ceylon
Members of the 4th Parliament of Ceylon
Members of the 5th Parliament of Ceylon
Members of the 6th Parliament of Ceylon
Ceylonese Knights Commander of the Order of the British Empire
1905 births
1967 deaths